This is a list of law schools in Hong Kong.

School of Law, City University of Hong Kong
Faculty of Law, The Chinese University of Hong Kong
Faculty of Law, The University of Hong Kong

See also

 List of law schools in China

Law schools
Law schools
Hong Kong